Bezhetsk is a town and the administrative center of Bezhetsky District in Tver Oblast, Russia, located on the Mologa River at its confluence with the Ostrechina. Population:     29,000 (1967). It was previously known as Gorodetsk (until 1766).

History
The settlement of Bezhichi was first mentioned in 1137, when it was owned by Novgorod. The original name, with the literal meaning of "refugees", suggests that early settlers were former Novgorodians.

In the early 15th century, the area of Bezhetsky Verkh was annexed by Grand Duchy of Moscow. Since 1433, Bezhetsk had its own prince, who was subordinate to the Grand Prince of Moscow.

In the course of the administrative reform carried out in 1708 by Peter the Great, Gorodetsk was included into Ingermanland Governorate (known since 1710 as St. Petersburg Governorate), but in 1727 it was transferred to Moscow Governorate. In 1766, Gorodetsk was renamed Bezhetsk. In 1775, Tver Viceroyalty was formed from the lands which previously belonged to Moscow and Novgorod Governorates. In 1776, Bezhetsk became the seat of Bezhetsky Uyezd. In 1796, Tver Viceroyalty was transformed into Tver Governorate. Bezhetsk remained the administrative center of the uyezd until 1929.

On July 12, 1929, the governorates and uyezds were abolished. Bezhetsky District, with the administrative center in Bezhetsk, was established within Bezhetsk Okrug of Moscow Oblast. On July 23, 1930, the okrugs were abolished and the districts were directly subordinated to the oblast. On January 29, 1935, Kalinin Oblast was established and Bezhetsk was transferred to Tver Oblast.

In the late 20th century, Bezhetsk, as a "reference small town" with well-preserved archives, became a subject of detailed academic studies of the 18th-century Russian countryside.

Administrative and municipal status
Within the framework of administrative divisions, Bezhetsk serves as the administrative center of Bezhetsky District. As an administrative division, it is, together with four rural localities, incorporated within Bezhetsky District as Bezhetsk Urban Settlement. As a municipal division, this administrative unit also has urban settlement status and is a part of Bezhetsky Municipal District.

Economy
Enterprises of timber, textile, and food industries, as well as a plant producing air compressors, are located in Bezhetsk.

Transportation

A railway connecting Rybinsk and Bologoye via Sonkovo passes through Bezhetsk, which is an important railway station.

Bezhetsk is located on the road connecting Tver and Vesyegonsk. It is also connected by roads with Sonkovo, Kesova Gora, and Maksatikha. There are local roads as well, with bus traffic originating from Bezhetsk.

The Mologa River is not navigable.

Culture and recreation
Bezhetsk contains seven cultural heritage monuments of federal significance and additionally twenty-four objects classified as cultural and historical heritage of local significance. The federal monuments include trade arcades and the Church of the Presentation of Mary. The oldest building in Bezhetsk is the white tent-like campanile of the Vvedenskaya Church, which was built by Yaroslavl masters in 1680-1682. The church itself was destroyed during the Soviet years. The Vozdvizhenskaya church goes back to the turn of the 18th century.

The Bezhetsk District and Literature Museum, located in Bezhetsk, shows expositions about the author Vyacheslav Shishkov and the musician Vasily Andreyev, who were both born in Bezhetsk.

Military
Bezhetsk is home to Dorokhovo, a major military air base.

Notable people
Bezhetsk and Bezhetsky Uyezd were the birthplace of writer Vyacheslav Shishkov, artists Alexander Samokhvalov and Sergey Osipov, and musician Vasily Andreyev.

References

Notes

Sources
А. Б. Каменский (A. B. Kamensky). Повседневность русских городских обывателей (Everyday Life of Russian City Dwellers). М., РГГУ, 2006.

External links
Official website of Bezhetsk 
Bezhetsk Business Directory 

Cities and towns in Tver Oblast
Bezhetsky Uyezd